Long Anap is a longhouse and settlement in the Telang Usan district of Sarawak, Malaysia.

The village is located on the Baram River between Long Palai (upstream) and Long Julan (downstream), near the top of the area known as the Middle Baram. There is a longhouse and a school in the village. A logging road links the village to Long Silat and K10 camp.

The people in this settlement belong to the Kenyah tribe. A tall structure called Belawing with flags has been erected in front of the longhouse. Half of its population has moved to form a new village called Long Tebanyi. If the Baram Dam hydroelectric project goes ahead, Long Anap will be one of the villages affected by the flooding of 389,000 hectares of jungle.

Neighbouring settlements include:

References

Villages in Sarawak